Birtukan Fente Alemu (born 18 June 1989) is an Ethiopian runner competing primarily in the 3000 metres steeplechase. She represented her country at the 2011 and 2015 World Championships reaching the final on the first occasion.

Competition record

1Did not start in the final

Personal bests
Outdoor
1500 metres – 4:31.96 (Rieti 2011)
3000 metres – 9:04.87 (Padova 2010)
5000 metres – 15:16.69 (Shanghai 2015)
3000 metres steeplechase – 9:24.91 (Rome 2015).
Indoor
5000 metres – 15:22.56 (Stockholm 2015)

References

External links
 

1989 births
Living people
Ethiopian female middle-distance runners
Ethiopian female steeplechase runners
World Athletics Championships athletes for Ethiopia
Place of birth missing (living people)
20th-century Ethiopian women
21st-century Ethiopian women